Sumangali  is a 1965 Telugu-language drama film, produced by T. Govindarajan under the Venus Pictures & Ashok Movies banner and directed by Adurthi Subba Rao. It stars Akkineni Nageswara Rao and Savitri, with music composed by K. V. Mahadevan. The film is a remake of the Tamil film Sarada (1962).

Plot
Prof. Viswam (Akkineni Nageswara Rao) leads a happy life with his mother Visalakshamma (G. Varalakshmi) & sister Uma (Vasanthi). Meanwhile, Viswam gets an appointment in a renowned college owned by Srihari Rao (Gummadi), his only daughter Sarada (Savitri) studies in the same college who admires Viswam's ideologies and they fall in love. Srihari Rao opposes it, as Sarada's alliance is fixed with his nephew Shekar (Jaggayya). But Sarada marries Viswam against her father's wish. Knowing it, depressed, Shekar leaves the house and becomes a wanderer as he loves Sarada from childhood. Soon Viswam reaches his hometown, picks up a new job and when the couple is dreaming about happy married life the things get shattered. Viswam meets with an accident in which he becomes impotent. Now Sarada's life is subliminal but she stands up with courage and protects her husband with celibacy. Parallelly, Shekar lands in the same city where he acquainted with Viswam and they become good friends. Distressed, Viswam not able to tolerate the torture faced by Sarada, so, he tries to commit suicide when Shekar protects and gives him a piece of advice to perform remarriage to his wife. At that moment, Viswam gets relaxed, takes acceptance of his mother, thereafter, Viswam learns the relation of Shekar & Sarada, so, he convinces him too. But devoted Sarada refuses the proposal when Viswam forcibly makes her agree. During the time of the wedding, Sarada takes poison declaring the Indian women's devotion to marriage. Finally, the movie ends Sarada departing in the lap of Viswam.

Cast
Akkineni Nageswara Rao as Viswam
Savitri as Sarada
Jaggayya as Shekar 
V. Nagayya as Venkata Chalam
Gummadi as Srihari Rao
Relangi as Dharma Raju
Padmanabham as Kondandam
G. Varalakshmi as Visalakshamma
Girija as Dharma Raju's wife
Sandhya as Srihari Rao's wife
Vasanthi as Uma
Sobhan Babu (Cameo appearance)
Jayanthi (Cameo appearance)

Crew
Art: G. V. Subba Rao
Choreography: P. L. Gopala Krishnan 
Lyrics - Dialogues: Acharya Aatreya
Playback: Ghantasala, P. Susheela, S. Janaki, P. B. Sreenivas, K. Jamuna Rani, L. R. Eswari, Swarnalata, Vasantha
Music: K. V. Mahadevan
Story: K. S. Gopala Krishna
Editing: T. Krishna
Cinematography: P. L. Roy
Producer: T. Govindarajan
Screenplay - Director: Adurthi Subba Rao
Banner: Venus Pictures & Ashok Movies
Release Date: 1 January 1965

Soundtrack

Music composed by K. V. Mahadevan. The song Kotha Pelli Koothura is a blockbuster. Lyrics were written by Acharya Aatreya. Music released on Audio Company.

References

Indian drama films
Telugu remakes of Tamil films
Films scored by K. V. Mahadevan
Films directed by Adurthi Subba Rao
1965 drama films
1965 films